Mohamed Kamal Eldin Fadl El-moula (born 30 November 1979 in Sinnar) is a Sudanese footballer who played for El-Merreikh in the Sudan Premier League.

Career
Fadlulmola joined 2008 to El-Merreikh, previously played for Al-Hilal (Port Sudan). The goalkeeper played the 2009 CAF Confederations Cup and the 2010 CAF Champions League for Al-Merreikh SC.

References

1979 births
Sudanese footballers
Living people
Sudan international footballers
2011 African Nations Championship players
Al-Merrikh SC players
People from Sennar (state)

Association football goalkeepers
Sudan A' international footballers